Gabriella Pound (born 16 October 1994) is an Australian rules footballer playing for the Carlton Football Club in the AFL Women's competition (AFLW). She was drafted by Carlton with the club's fourth selection and the thirtieth overall in the 2016 AFL Women's draft. She made her debut in Round 1, 2017, in the club and the league's inaugural match at Ikon Park against . A consistent 2019 season as a running half back flanker with clean disposal, saw Gabriella awarded the honour of a place in The All Australian Team. Pound is of Sri Lankan descent through her father.

References

External links

Living people
1994 births
Carlton Football Club (AFLW) players
Australian rules footballers from Victoria (Australia)
Sportswomen from Victoria (Australia)
Australian people of Sri Lankan descent
Melbourne University Football Club (VFLW) players